Alvise II Mocenigo (Luigi Mocenigo) (3 January 1628, in Venice – 6 May 1709, in Venice) was the 110th doge of Venice from 17 July 1700 until his death.

See also
Mocenigo family
Alvise I Mocenigo

References

1628 births
1709 deaths
Alvise
17th-century Venetian people
18th-century Doges of Venice